Bloemendaal is a town in the Netherlands

Bloemendaal may also refer to:
Bloemendaal aan Zee, seaside resort in the Bloemendaal municipality
Bloemendaal railway station
a HC Bloemendaal, a Bloemendaal field hockey team
Bloemendaal (residence) a mansion in the United States build in 1894

People with the surname Bloemendaal
Mark Bloemendaal, Dutch footballer
Scott Bloemendaal, Dutch composer